David Regalado (born 17 January 1952) is a Mexican former footballer. He competed in the men's tournament at the 1972 Summer Olympics.

References

External links
 

1952 births
Living people
Mexican footballers
Mexico international footballers
Olympic footballers of Mexico
Footballers at the 1972 Summer Olympics
Place of birth missing (living people)
Association football midfielders